After the Morning is a solo piano album by John Hicks. It was recorded in concert at the 1992 Montreal International Jazz Festival.

Recording and Music
This solo piano album by John Hicks was recorded in concert at the Montreal International Jazz Festival on July 8, 1992.

Release and reception

After the Morning was released by the Canadian label Dominic Sciscente Music. The Penguin Guide to Jazz identified the shorter pieces as highlights – "often little more than a theme statement and a brief, cadenza-like solo." The reviewers described the piano sound as "respectable for the time, but a bit cavernous."

Track listing
All compositions by John Hicks except where noted
"That Ole Devil Called Love" (Allan Roberts, Doris Fisher) – 4:41
 "A Flower Is a Lovesome Thing/Chelsea Bridge" (Billy Strayhorn) – 10:02
 "Mt. Royal Blues" – 4:52
 "Embraceable You" (George Gershwin, Ira Gershwin) – 6:13
 "Monk's Mood/Reflections/Ruby, My Dear" (Thelonious Monk) – 8:54
 "After the Morning" – 6:19	
 "Meditation" (Antônio Carlos Jobim, Newton Mendonça, Norman Gimbel) – 7:25
 "Oblivion" (Bud Powell) – 3:45
 "Moment to Moment/Never Let Me Go" (Henry Mancini, Johnny Mercer/Jay Livingston, Ray Evans) – 6:53
 "Some Other Spring/Some Other Time" (Arthur Herzog, Jr., Irene Kitchings/Hicks) – 5:17
 "Moment's Notice" (John Coltrane) – 3:03
 "Midwest Blues (Blues on the River)" – 4:10

Personnel
John Hicks – piano

Notes

References

1992 albums
John Hicks (jazz pianist) live albums
Solo piano jazz albums